Pseudathrips similis is a moth in the family Gelechiidae. It was described by Povolný in 1981. It is found in Saudi Arabia.

References

Gelechiinae
Moths described in 1981